"Protect the Land" is a song recorded by Armenian-American heavy metal band System of a Down. It was released as a double A-side single with "Genocidal Humanoidz" on November 6, 2020, through American Recordings and Columbia Records, to raise awareness and funds for Armenia and the unrecognised Republic of Artsakh amid the 2020 Nagorno-Karabakh war. It is the band's first release in 15 years since their fifth studio album Hypnotize (2005), their first single in 14 years since "Lonely Day" (2006), and their first two singles to not feature their long-time producer Rick Rubin. The two singles have raised over $600,000 that was donated to the Armenia Fund to help those who have been affected by the war.

Background and release

"Protect the Land" was written by the band's guitarist and second singer Daron Malakian in 2018 along with another song about tensions involving the unrecognised Artsakh, called "Lives", for his second solo album, Dictator. In late September 2020, after a new war broke out between Armenia, Artsakh and Azerbaijan in the disputed Nagorno-Karabakh region, the band members started using their platforms to raise awareness of the issue. The band's lead singer Serj Tankian, whose grandfather survived the 1915 Armenian genocide, told The Fader that he sees a "high probability of genocide of Armenians" in Artsakh being carried out by Azerbaijan with the support of Turkey. Tankian donated $250,000 to the Armenia Fund and also participated in an online fundraising concert called "Rock for Artsakh" in October.

Within a few days of deciding to record, each musician started arranging his own part. Tankian developed his harmonies for "Protect the Land" while still in New Zealand, where he lives part-time, and he later flew to Los Angeles on October 11 to join everyone in the studio. They finished tracking the cuts that week. Bassist Shavo Odadjian said that "it was such a pleasure for us to be together in the studio again, very comforting and natural, like no time had passed at all". On November 6, 2020, "Protect the Land" was released along with "Genocidal Humanoidz" digitally as a double A-side single. The artwork of the track features the flag of Armenia with the zig-zag chevron pattern of the flag of the Republic of Artsakh superimposed and the We Are Our Mountains monument in its capital Stepanakert. It is the first release of the band in 15 years since their chart topping fifth studio album Hypnotize from 2005. In an official statement released on their website after the singles' premiere, the band said they hoped their fans would listen to the songs and "be inspired to speak out about the horrific injustices and human rights violations occurring there now".

Critical reception and composition
In a positive review for Louder magazine, Merlin Alderslade wrote that the track is "built around a massive, groovy, swaying Daron Malakian riff that recalls a little of Steal This Album! banger "Mr Jack". It sounds huge – a reminder of the guitarist's impeccable knack for a big hook – but really it's the vocals that steal the show here. Daron and lead vocalist Serj Tankian remain metal's greatest singing duo, and hearing their voices wrapped around each other in perfect harmony again doesn't so much pull on the heartstrings as slap them like a double bass". Kory Grow from Rolling Stone wrote: "The track opens with a slow-churning guitar riff and Malakian and Tankian harmonizing lyrics that ask listeners what they would do if someone tried to push them from their homes. "Would you stay and take a stand?" they ask mournfully. "Would you stay with gun in hand? They protect the land". To drive it home, when they repeat those questions later, Malakian runs his hands up his guitar neck, imitating the sound of bombs falling".

Music video

The music video for "Protect the Land", directed by Shavo Odadjian and Ara Soudjian, was uploaded to the band's YouTube channel on November 6, 2020. It features footage of Armenian soldiers on the frontlines, as well as shots of the band with projections of some of the footage Odadjian shot superimposed over their faces, similar to the band's “Toxicity” video.

While talking about the concept of the video, Odadjian said: "I brought in everyone from every age. We have babies, my two sons, the high priest of L.A. [Los Angeles], doctors, cab drivers, and soldiers in the video. At the same time, we have people in Armenia in Artsakh filming on the frontlines of the war going on. So the message is, 'I know we're thousands of miles away, but we stand with our troops and we stand for this one common cause as Armenians.'"

As of December 2022, the song has 17 million views on YouTube.

Charts

Weekly charts

Year-end charts

Release history

See also
 "Genocidal Humanoidz"

References

External links
 

System of a Down songs
Songs written by Daron Malakian
2020 singles
American Recordings (record label) singles
Columbia Records singles
Anti-war songs
2020 songs